Samba Jazz!! is the third album recorded by the group Meirelles e Os Copa 5, led by J. T. Meirelles. Released in 2002, this album celebrates the return of the group, after a long period without recording any song. The album was produced by J. T. Meirelles, who also composed and arranged all its songs.

Despite the long period between the last album, Novo som, and Samba Jazz!!, Meirelles tried to keep the same music conception he had when he was 20 years old. He tried to create simple songs, influenced by jazz, but at the same time which remind Brazilian music. In fact, this album evocates the samba-jazz rhythm exactly as in 1964, when Meirelles e Os Copa 5 recorded their first album, O som.

Track listing

Personnel

J. T. Meirelles: alto saxophone, flute
Guilherme Dias Gomes: flugelhorn
Laércio de Freitas: piano
Adriano Griffoni: bass
Robertinho Silva: drums and percussion

References

2002 albums
J. T. Meirelles albums